Frederick IV  (18 October 1671 – 19 July 1702) was the reigning Duke of Holstein-Gottorp.

He was born in Gottorf Castle as the elder son of Duke Christian Albert of Holstein-Gottorp and Princess Frederica Amalia of Denmark. He was married on 12 May 1698 to Princess Hedwig Sophia of Sweden and they had an only child, Charles Frederick, who eventually fathered the future Tsar Peter III of Russia, therefore making Frederick a patrilineal ancestor to all Russian emperors after Catherine II.

He took part in the Great Northern War and was killed by artillery fire in the Battle of Kliszów in Poland.

According to Robert Massie's Peter the Great: His Life and World, Duke Frederick arrived in Stockholm to marry his cousin, Princess Hedwig Sophia, soon befriending his first cousin and new brother-in-law, King Charles XII (their respective mothers, Frederica Amalia and Ulrika Eleonora, being daughters of Frederick III of Denmark). His visit made such an impression on Swedish society that the excesses surrounding him and the King earned him "the Gottorp Fury" as a nickname. Duke Frederick and King Charles regularly participated in wild festivities, drinking binges, and outlandish pranks. Generally, Duke Frederick's influence was the blame for the King's "reckless" lifestyle. There were even rumors at the time that the Duke sought to kill the King and usurp the throne. As it happened, according to Massie in the aforementioned book, the 17-year-old King Charles, in the summer of 1699, pushed himself to an unbearable point of excess and vowed never to touch another drop of liquor again. Apparently, writes Massie, the King stuck to beer thereafter, and even just drank beer when he was either wounded or post-battle. As for his relationship with his cousin Frederick, they remained on good terms, so much that King Charles gave him military assistance to defend Holstein-Gottorp from Danish invasion.

Ancestry

Notes and references

See also
 History of Schleswig-Holstein
 House of Holstein-Gottorp

 

Dukes of Holstein-Gottorp
Military personnel killed in action
1671 births
1702 deaths
Military personnel from Schleswig-Holstein